In Greek mythology, Eudora or Eudore (Ancient Greek: Εὐδώρη means 'early' or 'leading' or 'she of good gifts') was a name given to three nymphs:

 Eudora, one of 3,000 Oceanids, water-nymph daughters of the Titans Oceanus and his sister-spouse Tethys.
 Eudora, the Nereid of sailing and a good fish-catch. She was one of the 50 sea-nymph daughters of the 'Old Man of the Sea' Nereus and the Oceanid Doris.
 Eudora, called "long-robed" in a Hesiodic fragment, was one of the Hyades, the nymphs associated with the configuration of stars known as the Hyades. She was the sister of Aesyle (Phaisyle) and Ambrosia, Polyxo and Coronis, and Cleeia and Phaeo. They were called the daughters of the Titan Atlas by either the Oceanids Aethra or Pleione, or of Hyas and Boeotia.

Notes

References 
 Bane, Theresa, Encyclopedia of Fairies in World Folklore and Mythology, McFarland, 2013. .
 Apollodorus, The Library with an English Translation by Sir James George Frazer, F.B.A., F.R.S. in 2 Volumes, Cambridge, MA, Harvard University Press; London, William Heinemann Ltd. 1921. ISBN 0-674-99135-4. Online version at the Perseus Digital Library. Greek text available from the same website.
 Hesiod, Theogony, in The Homeric Hymns and Homerica with an English Translation by Hugh G. Evelyn-White, Cambridge, MA., Harvard University Press; London, William Heinemann Ltd. 1914. Online version at the Perseus Digital Library.
 Hyginus, Gaius Julius, Astronomica, in The Myths of Hyginus, edited and translated by Mary A. Grant, Lawrence: University of Kansas Press, 1960. Online version at the Topos Text Project.
 Hyginus, Gaius Julius, Fabulae, in The Myths of Hyginus, edited and translated by Mary A. Grant, Lawrence: University of Kansas Press, 1960. Online version at the Topos Text Project.
 Kerényi, Carl, The Gods of the Greeks, Thames and Hudson, London, 1951.
Most, G.W., Hesiod: The Shield, Catalogue of Women, Other Fragments, Loeb Classical Library, No. 503, Cambridge, Massachusetts, Harvard University Press, 2007, 2018. . Online version at Harvard University Press.
 Smith, William; Dictionary of Greek and Roman Biography and Mythology, London (1867). Online version at the Perseus Digital Library

Oceanids
Nereids